Lisia Góra  is a village in the administrative district of Gmina Dygowo, within Kołobrzeg County, West Pomeranian Voivodeship, in north-western Poland.

References

Villages in Kołobrzeg County